WFPX-TV (channel 62) is a television station licensed to Archer Lodge, North Carolina, United States, broadcasting the digital multicast network Bounce TV to the Research Triangle region. It is owned and operated by the Ion Media subsidiary of the E. W. Scripps Company alongside Rocky Mount–licensed Ion Television outlet WRPX-TV (channel 47). WFPX-TV and WRPX-TV share a sales office on Gresham Lake Road in Raleigh; through a channel sharing agreement, the two stations transmit using WRPX-TV's spectrum from a tower northeast of Middlesex, North Carolina.

Originally licensed to Fayetteville, North Carolina, WFPX served as a full-time satellite of WRPX-TV from 1998 until 2018. WFPX's signal covered areas of south-central North Carolina that received a marginal to non-existent signal from WRPX, although there was significant overlap between the two stations' contours otherwise. WFPX was a straight simulcast of WRPX; on-air references to WFPX were limited to Federal Communications Commission (FCC)-mandated hourly station identifications during programming. Aside from its former transmitter, WFPX did not maintain any physical presence locally in Fayetteville.

History
Channel 62 signed on in 1985 as WFCT, an independent station owned by Fayetteville/Cumberland Telecasters. Attorneys Robinson and Katherine Everett of Durham, founders of WRDU-TV (now MyNetworkTV affiliate WRDC) in Durham, along with WJKA (now Fox affiliate WSFX-TV) in Wilmington and WGGT (now MyNetworkTV affiliate WMYV) in Greensboro, were two of the principals in this company.

WFCT temporarily carried the programming of then-NBC affiliate WPTF-TV after that station's tower collapsed in an ice storm on December 10, 1989. The station changed call letters to WFAY in 1993 and became a Fox affiliate in 1994; the affiliation came as part of a deal that also saw the Everetts switch their CBS affiliates, WJKA and KECY-TV in El Centro, California/Yuma, Arizona to Fox. Even though WFAY was located in the same market as WLFL (a Fox affiliate at the time), it mainly focused on communities located south of Fayetteville that did not get a good signal from WLFL. Some of its non-network programming was also simulcast to the Raleigh–Durham area on WRAY-TV for a couple of years in the mid-1990s until it was acquired by the Shop at Home network.

WFAY later became WFPX and dropped Fox after being bought out by Paxson in the middle of 1998, shortly before WRAZ assumed the Fox affiliation for the Raleigh market. Later that year, newly minted Fox station WFXB out of the Florence–Myrtle Beach market expanded its signal to cover areas formerly served by WFAY. It is worthy of note that WFPX's signal was not seen at all in the northern portion of the Raleigh–Durham–Fayetteville market, but covered northern portions of the Florence–Myrtle Beach market, which did not have its own Ion Television affiliate until 2015, when WBTW added Ion on a digital subchannel following a deal made with Media General.

Channel-sharing agreement with WRPX
On April 4, 2017, WFPX was identified by the FCC as receiving $62.4 million for the spectrum reallocation auction. The station later entered into a channel-sharing arrangement with WRPX. Since WRPX's signal does not reach Fayetteville, WFPX changed its city of license to Archer Lodge, east of Raleigh. After the channel share went into effect, WRPX-DT3, carrying Ion Life (later Ion Plus), took WFPX's 62.1 virtual channel, assuring that network market-wide must-carry over pay-TV systems.

On February 27, 2021, after the closure of Ion Plus, WFPX-TV became a Bounce TV owned-and-operated station.

Technical information

Subchannel

Analog-to-digital conversion
WFPX-TV discontinued regular programming on its analog signal, over UHF channel 62, at noon on June 12, 2009, the official date in which full-power television stations in the United States transitioned from analog to digital broadcasts under federal mandate. The station's digital signal continued to broadcasts on its pre-transition UHF channel 36. Through the use of PSIP, digital television receivers display the station's virtual channel as its former UHF analog channel 62, which was among the high band UHF channels (52–69) that were removed from broadcasting use as a result of the transition.

Spectrum repack
WFPX-TV moved from channel 15 to channel 32 on September 11, 2019.

Out-of-market coverage
In recent years, WFPX has been carried on cable in multiple areas within the Wilmington media market.

References

Bounce TV affiliates
E. W. Scripps Company television stations
Television channels and stations established in 1985
1985 establishments in North Carolina
FPX-TV
Johnston County, North Carolina